Gary Piantedosi (born December 9, 1954) is an American rower. He competed in the men's coxless four event at the 1976 Summer Olympics.

References

External links
 

1954 births
Living people
American male rowers
Olympic rowers of the United States
Rowers at the 1976 Summer Olympics
Rowers from Boston